Paroxysmal hand hematoma is a skin condition characterized by spontaneous focal hemorrhage into the palm or the volar surface of a finger, which results in transitory localized pain, followed by rapid swelling and localized blueish discoloration.

See also 
 List of cutaneous conditions
 Hematoma
 Phalanx bone

References 

2. New England Journal of  Medicine, 376;26 nejm.org June 29, 2017.

Vascular-related cutaneous conditions
Syndromes